Middalya Station is a pastoral lease that operates as a sheep station in Western Australia.

The Minilya River runs through the property. The traditional owners of the area are the Tharrkari people, who currently lease and manage Ullawarra station.

It is able to be stocked with 19,350 sheep, with a flock of 15,200 being recommended. It is composed of sandplains, alluvial and stony plains and hills.

In 1887 the property was stocked with 6,000 sheep, which produced 87 bales of wool; by 1890 the flock had increased to 16,000 producing 220 bales.
J. H. Mansfield, who had previously managed Karratha Station and later owned Maroonah Station, was managing Middalya in the 1880s.

Douglas John Hearman acquired Middalya at some time prior to 1897.

In 1907 the property was hit by a severe storm and recorded  of rain in a short period of time. The homestead was damaged by strong winds and several windmills were blown over.

During the shearing season of 1918 a total of 15,500 sheep, including 3,000 lambs, were shorn, producing a total of 300 bales of wool.

A flock of 15,936 sheep and 5,208 lambs were shorn in 1923 producing 525 bales of wool.

See also
 List of pastoral leases in Western Australia

References

Pastoral leases in Western Australia
Stations (Australian agriculture)
Shire of Carnarvon